Lincoln High School is a public secondary school located in Lincoln, Nebraska, United States. A part of the Lincoln Public Schools school district, it is the largest high school in the city.  More than 40,000 students have graduated from Lincoln High in its 148-year history. The school colors are red and black, and the mascot is the Links. Its mascot is memorialized in a statue on the school's front lawn, with four individual links chained together. These represent the hopeful characteristics of Lincoln High School: tradition, diversity, excellence, and unity.

History
Lincoln High School was founded in 1871 and is the oldest of six public high schools in the city of Lincoln. The present building was opened in 1915, with significant additions completed in 1927, 1957, 1985, and 1996. It is accredited by the North Central Association of Colleges and Secondary Schools and has the AA accreditation rating of the Nebraska State Board of Education. In 1984 it was named a Recognized School of Excellence by the U.S. Department of Education. Lincoln High School began its formal participation in the International Baccalaureate Program in 2008 after a formal application process. It is one of only three high schools in Nebraska involved in the program. The others are Millard North High School and Omaha Central High School, both located in Omaha.

In 2018, Lincoln High School was honored as a "School of Opportunity" by the National Education Policy Center, at the University of Colorado Boulder, for its commitment to multicultural educational support and academic rigor. It was one of only eight public schools awarded this honor with the "Gold" designation, the highest designation for this honor. Principal Mark Larson states, "This recognition also speaks to the unique culture that has been in place at Lincoln High for many years and hopefully will continue for years to come."

While teaching at Lincoln High School, four Lincoln High faculty have been honored as Nebraska Teacher of the Year, including John Heineman (2000), Patsy Koch Johns (2006), Amber Vlasnik (2017), and Sydney Jensen (2019).

After the Lincoln Public Schools administration building burned in 2011, the Lincoln High Library Media Center staff realized the importance of digitizing the archives of Lincoln High School. The school newspaper, The Advocate, is available digitally.

Student body and academic programs
The student body is 46% White, 11% African-American, 10% Asian-American, 21% Hispanic/Latino, and 2% Native American, Native Hawaiian, or Alaska Native. 9% of students are of two or more races. LHS has approximately 330 students in ELL (English Language Learner) classes. Over 60% of its student body is in the Free or Reduced Price Lunch Program, and 17% are identified as either gifted or highly gifted. Over 30 different languages are spoken as first languages to students. The largest group speak Spanish (56), and the next four largest groups speak Arabic, Kurdish, Vietnamese, and Karen. Other languages spoken are Russian, Ukrainian, Nuer (Sudan), Bosnian, Pashtu, Dinka, Cambodian, Filipino, Chinese, and Burmese.

Lincoln High School offers hundreds of courses in twelve different departments to its over 2,000 students, operating on an eight-period day schedule. It has 150 certified staff members and 90 support staff members.

Athletics

Baseball

Lincoln High School's baseball program is headed by Coach Jon Beiermann, JV Tanner Soderberg, Reserve Cieran Riley, and 9th Joe Cortese. The baseball program won state championships in 1951, 1952, 1954, 1955, 1956 and 1963, and last had measurable success under coach Sam Sharpe from 1991-1992.

Wrestling

Lincoln High School's wrestling program is headed by Coach Andy Genrich.  Lincoln High last won a state championship in 1992 and has had 29 individual state champions. In 2009, the program had success in qualifying three wrestlers for state, all by winning first place at the district meet.

State championships

Notable alumni
 John Moore Allison – diplomat
 Dick Cavett – entertainer and author
 Sandy Dennis – Academy Award-winning actress
 Mike Fultz – drafted 32nd overall in 1977 NFL Draft by New Orleans Saints
 Dixie Kiefer – U.S. Navy commodore, served in both world wars 
 Bill Kinnamon – Major League Baseball umpire
 Herman F. Kramer – U.S. Army major general
 Les Mann – MLB player for Boston Braves, Chicago Cubs, St. Louis Cardinals, Cincinnati Reds, and New York Giants
 Shirley Marsh – Nebraska state senator
 Bernie Masterson – NFL player and winner of 1940 NFL Championship game with the Chicago Bears
 Gil Savery – journalist
 Ted Sorensen – special counsel to President John F. Kennedy
 Charles Starkweather – spree killer, responsible for murders of 11 people in the 1950s
 Larry Willmore – economist at United Nations Department of Economic and Social Affairs and IIASA, Schloss Laxenburg, Austria
 Les Witte – two-time consensus All-American basketball player at Wyoming
 Willard Witte – men's basketball head coach of 1933–34 Wyoming national championship team

References

External links
 LHS homepage
 LPS homepage
 The Advocate - LHS newspaper'

Public high schools in Nebraska
Schools in Lincoln, Nebraska
International Baccalaureate schools in Nebraska
Educational institutions established in 1871
1871 establishments in Nebraska